Reica Staiger (born 8 November 1996) is a Swiss ice hockey player for EHC Winterthur and the Swiss national team. She participated at the 2015 IIHF Women's World Championship.

References

1996 births
Living people
Swiss women's ice hockey defencemen